Tarshino is a rural locality (a village) in Yurovskoye Rural Settlement, Gryazovetsky District, Vologda Oblast, Russia. The population was 13 as of 2002.

Geography 
Tarshino is located 34 km northwest of Gryazovets (the district's administrative centre) by road. Minkino is the nearest rural locality.

References 

Rural localities in Gryazovetsky District